Charles Daniel Drake (April 11, 1811 – April 1, 1892) was a United States senator from Missouri and Chief Justice of the Court of Claims.

Charles Drake was successively a Whig, a Know Nothing, and a Democrat.

Education and career

Born on April 11, 1811, in Cincinnati, Ohio, Drake attended St. Joseph's College in Bardstown, Kentucky in 1823 and 1824, and Partridge's Military Academy in Middletown, Connecticut in 1824 to 1825. He was a midshipman in the United States Navy from 1827 to 1830. He read law with Benjamin Drake in Cincinnati. He entered private practice in Cincinnati from 1833 to 1834. He continued private practice in St. Louis, Missouri from 1834 to 1847, then returned to Cincinnati from 1847 to 1849. He was treasurer of the Board of Foreign Missions of the Presbyterian Church in 1849. He resumed private practice in St. Louis from 1850 to 1867. He was a member of the Missouri House of Representatives from 1859 to 1860. He was a delegate and Vice President of the Missouri constitutional convention in 1865.

Leader of Radical Republicans

During the American Civil War, Drake became a fierce opponent of slavery, and a leader of the Radical Republicans. From 1861 to 1863, he proposed without success the immediate and uncompensated emancipation of slaves. He was defeated by the conservative Republicans led by Governor Hamilton Rowan Gamble and supported by Lincoln. By 1863, Drake had organized his Radical faction and called for immediate emancipation, a new constitution, and a system of disfranchisement of all Confederate sympathizers in Missouri. He served as vice president of the 1865 state constitutional convention, where he stood out as the most active leader. Missouri German leader Carl Schurz commented about him, "in politics he was inexorable ... most of the members of his party, especially in the country districts, stood much in awe of him." The new Constitution was adopted and became known as the "Drake constitution." The Radicals maintained absolute control of the state from 1865 to 1871, with Drake as their leader. To maintain power, Drake and the Radical Republicans disfranchised every man who had supported the Confederacy, even indirectly. They made an 81-point checklists of actions. The United States Supreme Court reversed the imposition of the oath on ministers, and became a highly controversial political issue across the state. The German Republicans in particular were angry. To further bolster his voting base, he secured the franchise for all black men in Missouri, despite qualms held by many Republicans.

Congressional service

Drake was elected as a Republican to the United States Senate and served from March 4, 1867, to December 19, 1870, when he resigned to accept a federal judicial position. He served as Chairman of the United States Senate Committee on Education for the 41st United States Congress.

Federal judicial service

Drake was nominated by President Ulysses S. Grant on December 12, 1870, to the Chief Justice seat on the Court of Claims (later the United States Court of Claims) vacated by Chief Justice Joseph Casey. He was confirmed by the United States Senate on December 12, 1870, and received his commission the same day. His service terminated on December 12, 1885, due to his resignation.

Later career and death

Following his resignation from the federal bench, Drake resumed private practice in Washington, D.C. from 1885 to 1892. He died on April 1, 1892, in Washington, D.C. His remains were cremated and the ashes interred in Bellefontaine Cemetery in St. Louis.

Family

Drake's father, Daniel Drake (1785–1852), was an American physician and author. His uncle, Benjamin Drake (1795–1841), was an American historian, editor, and writer.

Works

References

Further reading
 Astor, Aaron. Rebels on the Border: Civil War, Emancipation, and the Reconstruction of Kentucky and Missouri (LSU Press, 2012).
 Burchard, Chad. "'Country or Slavery': Charles Daniel Drake and the Rise and Fall of Radical Unionism in Missouri; 1860-1870" (BA Thesis, Vanderbilt University. 2006). online
 Erwin, James. The Homefront in Civil War Missouri (The History Press, 2014).
 Parrish, William Earl. Turbulent Partnership: Missouri and the Union, 1861-1865 (U of Missouri Press, 1963).
 Parrish, William Earl. A History of Missouri: 1860 to 1875. Vol. 3. University of Missouri Press, 1973).
 Parrish, William Earl. Missouri under Radical rule, 1865-1870 (U of Missouri Press, 1965).

External links

1811 births
1892 deaths
American legal writers
American Presbyterians
Members of the Missouri House of Representatives
Missouri state court judges
Politicians from Cincinnati
United States Navy midshipmen
Judges of the United States Court of Claims
Republican Party United States senators from Missouri
Radical Republicans
Missouri Republicans
Norwich University alumni
United States Article I federal judges appointed by Ulysses S. Grant
19th-century American judges
19th-century American politicians